Kjeld Jacobsen (11 November 1915 – 6 June 1970) was a Danish actor. He appeared in more than 40 films between 1945 and 1970. For his role as the father in Once There Was a War he won the Bodil Award for Best Actor in a Supporting Role.

Selected filmography 

 The Red Meadows (1945)
 The Invisible Army (1945)
 Lise kommer til Byen (1947)
 The Swedenhielm Family (1947)
 The Viking Watch of the Danish Seaman (1948)
 Den opvakte jomfru (1950)
 Alt dette og Island med (1951)
 This Is Life (1953)
 Der kom en dag (1955)
 Hidden Fear (1957)
 Englen i sort (1957)
 Faith, Hope and Witchcraft (1960)
 Komtessen (1961)
 Paradise and Back (1964)
 To (1964)
 Once There Was a War (1966)
 Brødrene på Uglegaarden (1967)

References

External links 
 

1915 births
1970 deaths
20th-century Danish male actors
Best Supporting Actor Bodil Award winners
Danish male film actors